Langford Lovell Price (1862–1950) was an English economist, born in London.  He was educated at Trinity College, Oxford, became fellow and treasurer of Oriel in 1888, and was Newmarch lecturer in statistics at University College, London in 1895–96.  In 1897 he was governor of Dulwich College and in 1898 was appointed an examiner in the "Moral Sciences Tripos" at Cambridge.

Writings
Price's writings include:  
 Industrial Peace (1897)
 A Short History of Political Economy in England (1891; second edition, 1896)
 Money and its Relation to Prices (1896; third edition, 1909)
 Economic Science and Practice (1896)
 A Short History of English Commerce and Industry (1900)
 The Position and Prospects of the Study of Economic History (1908)
 Co-operation and Co-partnership (1913)

References

 

English economists
1862 births
1950 deaths
Alumni of Trinity College, Oxford
People from London